Ulrich Pinner (born 7 February 1954) is a former professional tennis player from Germany. He achieved a career-high singles ranking of world No. 19 in August 1979 and was the German No. 1 from 1978-1980.

Pinner participated in ten Davis Cup ties for West Germany from 1976 to 1982, posting a 12–8 record in singles and a 2–1 record in doubles.

Career finals

Singles: 5 (4–1)

External links
 
 
 

1954 births
Living people
People from Zittau
West German male tennis players